Dongzhu railway station is a railway station located in Fuli Township, Hualien County, Taiwan. It is located on the Taitung line and is operated by the Taiwan Railways Administration.

References

1924 establishments in Taiwan
Railway stations in Hualien County
Railway stations opened in 1924
Railway stations served by Taiwan Railways Administration